Duane Garrison Hunt (September 19, 1884—March 31, 1960) was an American prelate of the Roman Catholic Church. He served as bishop of the Diocese of Salt Lake City in Utalh from 1937 until his death in 1960.

Biography

Early life and education 
Raised in a Methodist family, Duane Hunt was born on September 19, 1884, in Reynolds, Nebraska, to Andrew Dixon and Lodema Esther (née Garrison) Hunt. He attended Cornell College in Mount Vernon, Iowa, where he earned a Bachelor of Arts degree in 1907. He then taught at public high schools in Iowa until 1911, when he enrolled at the University of Iowa Law School. However, his poor eyesight forced him to withdraw from law school in 1912.

Hunt then entered the graduate school at the University of Chicago, in the field of public speaking. During his studies, he began to examine and question Methodism, his birth religion. He decided to convert to Catholicism, and was baptized at St. Thomas Church and Convent in Chicago in 1913. Shortly after his graduation from the University of Chicago, he moved to Salt Lake City, where he served as a faculty member of the speech department at the University of Utah from 1913 to 1916. Hunt resigned from his teaching post in order to study for the priesthood. He studied at St. Patrick's Seminary in Menlo Park, California, from 1916 to 1920.

Priesthood 
On June 27, 1920, Hunt was ordained a priest for the Diocese of Salt Lake by Bishop Joseph Glass in the Cathedral of the Madeleine. He worked as a missionary in Vernal, Utah for eight months before becoming a curate at the cathedral, where he also served as director of the choir from 1923 to 1937. Hunt was named a papal chamberlain in December 1924, and raised to the rank of domestic prelate in April 1930. He became rector of the Cathedral of the Madeleine in 1925 and chancellor of the diocese in 1926. Hunt also served as vicar general of the diocese.

From 1927 to 1949, Hunt was the weekly speaker on NBC's "Catholic Hour," a radio program in which he discussed Catholic doctrine. He served as editor of the diocesan newspaper, The Intermountain Catholic,  from 1926 to 1934. Despite his poor eyesight, he ranked among the best tennis players in Utah and coached the first diocesan baseball league in 1928.

Bishop of Salt Lake 
On August 6, 1937, Hunt was appointed the fifth bishop of the Diocese of Salt Lake City by Pope Pius XI. He received his episcopal consecration on October 28, 1937, from Archbishop John Mitty, with Bishops Robert Armstrong and Thomas Gorman serving as co-consecrators. Hunt was the first Methodist convert to become a Catholic bishop.

During his tenure, Hunt established fifteen parishes throughout the state. He also invited such religious institutes as the Carmelites, Sisters of Charity of the Incarnate Word, and Trappists to serve in Utah. An apologist, he authored several defenses of the Catholic Church.  These included The Continuity of the Catholic Church, which refuted Church of Jesus Christ of Latter Day Saints (LDS) claims against Catholicism.

Death and legacy 
Hunt died from a heart ailment on March 31, 1960, at age 75 at Holy Cross Hospital in Salt Lake City. His funeral was attended by LDS Church president David O. McKay.

External links 

 The Intermountain Catholic 
 The Continuity of the Catholic Church

References

1884 births
1960 deaths
People from Jefferson County, Nebraska
Converts to Roman Catholicism from Methodism
Roman Catholic bishops of Salt Lake City
20th-century Roman Catholic bishops in the United States
University of Iowa College of Law alumni
Cornell College alumni
University of Chicago alumni
University of Utah faculty
Catholics from Nebraska